Maria Chapdelaine is a French-Canadian historical drama film, released in 1983. An adaptation of Louis Hémon's novel Maria Chapdelaine, the film was directed by Gilles Carle and starred Carole Laure in the title role.

Plot 
Maria Chapdelaine is set in the Lac Saint-Jean region of Quebec in the early years of the 20th century. The beautiful Maria (Carole Laure), who dreams of an easier life than the one she must endure in the wilderness, gives her heart to a handsome lumberjack (Nick Mancuso) and waits for his return.

Cast
The cast includes Claude Rich, Amulette Garneau, Yoland Guérard, Pierre Curzi, Donald Lautrec, Gilbert Sicotte, Guy Thauvette, Stéphane Quéry, Josée-Anne Fortin, Louis-Philippe Milot, Gilbert Comptois, Patrick Messe, Claude Evrard, Claude Berval, Guy Godin, Marie Tifo, Jean-Pierre Masson, Dominique Briand, Claude Prégent, Angèle Arsenault, Jean Ricard, Guy L'Écuyer, Rolland Bédard, Raoul Duguay, Michel Rivard, Gilles Valiquette, Michel Langevin, Cédric Noël, José Ledoux, Renée Girard, Rock Demers, Yvon Sarrazin, Claude Trudel, Jean-Pierre Rhéaume, Georges Levchtouk and Gilbert Moore.

Production
Gilles Carle was selected to direct the film due to his successful adaption of Roger Lemelin's Les Plouffe. Astral Bellevue Pathé, Canadian Broadcasting Corporation, and TF1 Group produced the film. The film was shot from 18 October to 20 December 1982, on a budget of $4.6 million. $250,000 in funding came from the SDICC.

Release
The film was distributed by Astral Media in Canada and UGC in France. It premiered at Place du Canada on 28 April 1983. The film was seen by 127,003 people in France.

Awards and nominations
At the 5th Genie Awards in 1984, the film earned 4 Genie Awards from 11 nominations:
Best Motion Picture
Best Actor: Nick Mancuso
Best Actress: Carole Laure
Best Supporting Actor: Pierre Curzi
Best Supporting Actress: Amulette Garneau
Best Art Direction: Jocelyn Joly
Best Cinematography: Pierre Mignot
Best Costume Design: Michèle Hamel
Best Overall Sound: Austin Grimaldi, Patrick Rousseau, Joe Grimaldi and Dino Pigat
Best Sound Editing: Claude Langlois, Patrick Dodd and Jean-Guy Montpetit
Best Original Score: Lewis Furey

bold denotes award winner

References

Works cited

External links
 
 

1983 films
1980s historical drama films
Films directed by Gilles Carle
1980s French-language films
1983 drama films
Films set in Quebec
Films based on Canadian novels
Saguenay–Lac-Saint-Jean in fiction
Canadian historical drama films
French-language Canadian films
1980s Canadian films